The Chenggu axe massacre was a mass murder that occurred in Chenggu County, Hanzhong, Shaanxi, China on June 23, 1998, when Yang Mingxin, a 39-year-old local farmer, killed nine people, and wounded three others with an axe. 

Yang, who was described as reticent, had refused to sell ten stolen geese for another farmer named Guo Baoning, and when the owner of the geese later caught him, Guo suspected Yang had informed on him. After a heated argument between the two, during which Guo threatened to kill Yang's family, Yang armed himself with an axe and hacked twelve villagers between 4 months and 71 years of age. Unable to locate Guo he eventually tried to commit suicide by drinking insecticide and hanging himself, but was rescued and taken to a hospital.

References

Massacres in 1998
Hanzhong
China
Axe murder
20th-century mass murder in China
Mass stabbings in China